The Russian Republic, referred to as the Russian Democratic Federal Republic  in the 1918 Constitution, was a short-lived state which controlled, de jure, the territory of the former Russian Empire after its proclamation by the Russian Provisional Government on 1 September (14 September) 1917 in a decree signed by Alexander Kerensky as Minister-Chairman and Alexander Zarudny as Minister of Justice.
 
The Government of the Russian Republic was dissolved after the Bolsheviks seized power by force on 7 November 1917. Nonetheless, a partially democratic election of the Constituent Assembly still took place later in November. On 18 January 1918, this assembly issued a decree, proclaiming Russia a democratic federal republic under the name "Russian Democratic Federative Republic", but had also been illegally dissolved by the Bolsheviks on the next day after the proclamation.

The Bolsheviks also used the name "Russian Republic" until the name "Russian Socialist Federative Soviet Republic" was officially adopted in the Constitution of July 1918. The term "Russian Republic" is sometimes used erroneously for the period between the abdication of the Emperor Nicholas II on 3 March 1917 (16 March, N.S.) and the declaration of the Republic in September. However, during that period the future status of the monarchy remained unresolved.

History 
Following the February Revolution, Emperor Nicholas II abdicated his throne and a Provisional Government was formed, under the leadership of Prince Georgy Lvov. The status of the monarchy was left unresolved.

Officially, the Republic's government was the Provisional Government, although de facto control of the country was contested between it, the soviets (chiefly the Petrograd Soviet), and various ethnic-based separatists (such as the Central Council of Ukraine). Soviets were political organizations of the proletariat, strongest in industrial regions, and were dominated by left-wing parties. Soviets, whose influence was supplemented with paramilitary forces, were occasionally able to rival the Provisional Government which had an ineffective state apparatus.

During his first weeks as prime minister, Lvov presided over a series of fleeting reforms which sought to radically liberalise Russia. Universal adult suffrage was introduced, freedoms of press and speech were granted, capital punishment abolished, and all legal restrictions of religion, class and race were removed. Unable to rally sufficient support, he resigned in July 1917 in favour of his Minister of War, Alexander Kerensky.

The Government's control of the military was tenuous. Seamen of the Baltic Fleet, for example, had far-left views and openly engaged in political activism in the capital. Right-wing proclivities among the army officers were also a problem – Kerensky's attempt to dismiss Gen. Lavr Kornilov led to a failed coup.

Following the failure of Kornilov's coup, Kerensky proclaimed Russia to be a Republic on 1 September, establishing a Provisional Council as temporary parliament, in preparation to the elections of a Constituent Assembly. However, on 7 November 1917, the Bolsheviks seized power and dissolved both the Provisional Government and the Provisional Council.

Nonetheless, a partially democratic election of the Constituent Assembly still took place later in November. On 18 January 1918, this assembly issued a decree, proclaiming Russia a democratic federal republic under the name "Russian Democratic Federative Republic", However, the next day the Assembly was dissolved by the Bolsheviks.

The Republic de jure continued to exist until the Bolsheviks proclaimed the creation of the Russian Soviet Republic on 25 January 1918. In response, anti-Bolshevik forces proclaimed the Russian State in September 1918, under the leadership of the Provisional All-Russian Government.

Principal institutions 

 Provisional Council of the Russian Republic
 Congress of Soviets
 Russian Provisional Government
 Directorate (Russia)

See also 
 Russian Empire
 Russian Civil War
 Soviet Union
 Petrograd Soviets
 World War I
 Bolshevists
 Elections in Russia

Notes

References

External links
 The Russian Republic proclaimed. Presidential Library
 Browder, R. P., Kerensky, A. F. The Russian Provisional Government, 1917: Documents. "Stanford University Press". Stanford, 1961. 

States and territories established in 1917
States and territories disestablished in 1917
Russian Revolution
Russian Provisional Government
Post–Russian Empire states
Former republics
1917 establishments in Russia
1917 disestablishments in Russia